Wrexham Victoria F.C. were a Welsh football club based in Wrexham, Wales.

History

Formed on Tuesday 18 August 1899 in the Bowling Green Pub, taking their name from an older club with the same name. Wrexham Victoria's first game was a 5–4 defeat against Newton Rangers, on Saturday 2 September 1899, in the Chester and District League, whilst their first victory was a 3–2 win over Tarporley on 16 September 1899.

Wrexham Victoria won the Football Association of Wales Trophy four times in 1890–91, 1900–01, 1901–02 and 1903–04.
They joined The Combination for the 1906–07 season, however they finished bottom of the league.

They were to be found playing in Division One of the Wrexham and District League for 1907–08.

The Wrexham Victoria name did make a return in the 1920s. They appear in the second round draw of the Welsh Amateur Cup in 1923–24 against Wrexham Civil Service. They were beaten 5–0 by Oswestry in the 1924–25 Welsh Amateur Cup.

Seasons

Notable players
  Harry Trainer – Wales Football International.
  James Trainer – Wales Football International.
  Horace Blew – Wales Football International, Mayor of Wrexham in 1923.
  William Davies – Wales Football International. League Champion with Blackburn Rovers in 1912.
  Edwin Hughes – Wales Football International.
  Job Wilding – Wales Football International.
  Tom Burke – Wales Football International.
  Arthur Davies – Wales Football International.

Honours

League
Chester and District League
Winners (1): 1902
Runners-up (2):1900, 1901

West Cheshire League Division 1
Winners (1): 1905
Runners-up (1): 1904

Cups
Welsh Amateur Cup
Winners (4): 1891, 1901, 1902, 1904

Denbighshire and Flintshire Charity Cup
Runners-up (2): 1903, 1906

Chester Charity Cup
Winners (1): 1902

St Martins Cup
Runners-up (1): 1905

Yerburgh Challenge Cup
Winners (1): 1902

Other Info

Wrexham Victoria F.C. are not to be confused with Wrexham F.C., Wrexham Olympic F.C. or Wrexham Gymnasium F.C.

References

Sport in Wrexham
Welsh football clubs in English leagues
Sport in Wrexham County Borough
Football clubs in Wales
Defunct football clubs in Wales
The Combination
Football clubs in Wrexham
West Cheshire Association Football League clubs